Shock is an unincorporated community in Gilmer County, West Virginia, United States. Shock has a post office with ZIP code 26638.

The community was named after the Shock family, original owners of the town site.

Climate
The climate in this area is characterized by hot, humid summers and generally mild to cool winters.  According to the Köppen Climate Classification system, Shock has a humid subtropical climate, abbreviated "Cfa" on climate maps.

References

Unincorporated communities in Gilmer County, West Virginia
Unincorporated communities in West Virginia